Jacek Józef Proszyk (born 7 May 1973 in Szamotuły) is a Polish historian and religions scholar. He specializes in the history of Jews and Protestants and in the general history of southern Poland and Czech Silesia.

Life
Jacek Proszyk graduated from the University of Warsaw in 2000 with a magister (Master of Arts) degree for a thesis on Jewish Institutions and Philanthropic Organisations in Bielsko and Biała in 1860–1939. In 2010 he was on a scholarship at the Hebrew University of Jerusalem. In 2012 he received his doktor (Ph.D.) degree from the Institute of Religious Studies at Kraków's Jagiellonian University for his dissertation, At the Crossroads of Orthodoxy, Haskalah, and Zionism: Social and Religious Transformations in the Jewish Religious Communities of Bielsko and Biała Krakowska in 1918–1939. He has taught in secondary-school and academic settings. His current post is with the History Department of the Bielsko-Biała Museum and Castle.

Work
Since 1998 he has been cooperating with the Jewish Community in Bielsko-Biała, managing the library and the archive. The Jewish community in Bielsko-Biała covers the territory of Oświęcim (Auschwitz); this is why he participated in the recovery of the former Oświęcim Synagogue, which was later handed over to Auschwitz Jewish Center in Oświęcim. In 2004, on behalf of the Jewish community in Bielsko-Biała, the owner of the allotment where the great synagogue in Oświęcim used to be, he managed the technical organisation of the archaeological excavation on the site of the former dismantled Jewish synagogue in Oświęcim. During the excavations, he documented all the retrieved objects. Nearly 400 kg of valuable metal Judaica from the synagogue were found on that occasion. During the excavations, an Israeli film director, Yahali Gad, shot a movie, which was presented in 2005. The movie was titled "A Treasure in Auschwitz".
 
In 2002 he was one of the people who rewrote the original of the Polish Brest Bible dating back to 1563, when it was reissued. In 1992–2011 he prepared more than 5000 detailed lists and photos of tombstones at Jewish cemeteries in the following locations, among others: Bielsko-Biała, Bircza, Cieszyn, Frysztak, Jasło, Kolbuszowa, Krosno, Nowy Sącz, Oświęcim, Sieniawa, Skoczów, Tyrawa Wołoska, Ulanów, Wschowa, Żywiec-Zablocie. In 2000–2010 he cooperated with the United States Holocaust Memorial Museum office in Warsaw and performed searches in the Polish State Archives. In 2007–2013 he wrote and directed more than 20 theatrical stories related to the history of Bielsko-Biała and the southern Poland for the Polish Theatre in Bielsko-Biała. The stories were very popular and well received by the local audience. It was through his initiative that numerous Jewish cemeteries in Poland were put in order, a few monuments and commemorative plaques were put up in the places where demolished synagogues used to stand and a lot of historical and genealogical research was conducted.

In 2008, he discovered the only surviving original object from the demolished the oldest synagogue of Maharshal in Lublin. It was a parochet from 1926, which is now preserved in the Jewish Community in Bielsko-Biala. In 2018 he discovered previously unknown photographs of Auschwitz concentration camp prisoners removing unexploded bombs in Czechowice. The photos were handed over to the Auschwitz-Birkenau Memorial and Museum.

Jacek Proszyk was supposed to have worked up Bielsko County for the 2018 study, Dalej jest noc, but "[found it impossible to obtain] data sufficiently reliable to… perform statistical analysis and [to determine] the exact number of persons who perished, the exact number… who survived, and how they survived." Proszyk concluded that he could only "describe… verified individual cases. The war", he writes, "was a great DESTRUCTION and LIE. We do not have… complete archival records… Even what we have is not always the truth… [I]n Bielsko and Biała [which were only part of the county he was to have covered, in order to survive] Jews, Poles, and [anti-Nazi] Germans [all had to flee, lie, or pretend to be what they were not]. This falsehood left its [imprint] in the records and accounts, and that is why I [felt compelled] to verify… every account and every entry." Proszyk was unable to submit generalized findings for Bielsko County, but hopes eventually to prepare a study of particular individuals' experiences there. Proszyk's experience highlights the methodological difficulties in undertaking a reliable study of such subject matter.

Proszyk is an active editor of Wikipedia.

Awards and recognition
2016, Maria and Łukasz Hirszowicz Awards – Jewish Historical Institute, Warsaw
1998, honorary badge “For the contribution to the Bielsko Voivodeship” – for preserving historical monuments
1998, honorary diploma “For preserving Jewish monuments” – the Israeli Ambassador to Poland

Publications
 
 
 
 
 
 
 
 

Selected articles

Notes

1973 births
21st-century Polish historians
Polish male non-fiction writers
University of Warsaw alumni
People from Szamotuły
Living people
Historians of Poland
Historians of the Holocaust in Poland
Wikipedia people